Influências is a Latin Grammy Award-nominated album by Brazilian musician Dori Caymmi, released in 2001. The album was nominated for Best Contemporary Brazilian album in 2004. Some of the songs in the album pay homage to his father - "La Vem A Baiana" and "Acontece Que Es Sou Baiana".

Track listing 
 "Conversa de Botequim" (with Gal Costa)
 "Faceira"  
 "Linda Flor (Yayá) (Ai, Yoyô)"  
 "Cor Do Pecado" 
 "Pé Do Lageiro" (with Dominguinhos)  
 "Serenata Do Adeus" 
 "Lá Vem Baiana"  
 "Copacabana"  
 "Acontece Que Eu Sou Baiano"  
 "É Doce Morrer No Mar" 
 "Berimbau" 
 "Felicidade" 
 "Desafinado"  
 "Migalhas de Amor"  
 "Clair de Lune"

References

Dori Caymmi official website

Dori Caymmi albums
2001 albums